Champagne Jam is an album by the Southern rock band Atlanta Rhythm Section, released in 1978. The single "Imaginary Lover" was the band's second Top 10 hit, peaking at #7 in the U.S. and #9 in Canada. The album itself was the band's most commercially successful, peaking at number 7 on the Billboard 200.

Track listing 
 "Large Time" (Bailey, Buie, Nix) – 2:55
 "I'm Not Gonna Let It Bother Me Tonight" (Buie, Daughtry, Nix) – 4:06
 "Normal Love" (Buie, Cobb, Daughtry, Nix) – 3:22
 "Champagne Jam" (Buie, Cobb, Nix) – 4:31
 "Imaginary Lover" (Buie, Daughtry, Nix) – 5:05
 "The Ballad of Lois Malone" (Bailey, Buie, Daughtry, Nix) – 4:30
 "The Great Escape" (Bailey, Buie, Nix) – 4:47
 "Evileen" (Buie, Daughtry, Nix) – 3:32

Personnel 
 Barry Bailey – electric guitar
 Buddy Buie – vocals
 J.R. Cobb – guitar, electric guitar, vocals
 Dean Daughtry – keyboards
 Paul Davis – vocals
 Paul Goddard – bass guitar
 Ronnie Hammond – vocals, background vocals
 Robert Nix – drums, background vocals

Production
 Producers: Buddy Buie, Robert Nix
 Engineer: Rodney Mills
 Mixing: Rodney Mills
 Original LP mastering: Bob Ludwig & Rodney Mills at Masterdisk
 Digital remastering: Suha Gur
 Art direction: Mike McCarty
 Design: Mike McCarty
 Photography: Rick Diamond

Certifications

References 

Atlanta Rhythm Section albums
1978 albums
Albums produced by Buddy Buie
Polydor Records albums